Southfield School was an independent school for girls in Brookline, Massachusetts, United States. Founded in 1992, its campus is also home to its brother school, Dexter, an independent school for boys founded in 1926. In 2013 the school merged with Dexter to form Dexter Southfield School.

Campus 
The 36-acre campus on the Boston-Brookline border provided a setting and facilities which serve the school community well. Of particular note is the Clay Center for Science and Technology which provides students with extraordinary classroom opportunities as well as a world-class astronomical observatory.

Athletics 
Southfield's athletic programs featured a combination of intramural and interscholastic offerings. In Kindergarten through Grade 2 physical education is a daily activity. Intramural competition was introduced in Grade 3 through Grade 6 during which students competed in many different sports with the goal of instilling a spirit of sportsmanship and teamwork. Beginning in Grade 7, athletes choose from a variety of interscholastic sports. Southfield teams competed against many schools throughout the New England area. The school used five fields on campus, including two multi-purpose turf fields and a dedicated baseball diamond. Two hockey rinks, the Lincoln Pool, and the Dalrymple Gymnasium provided indoor athletic facilities.  The rowing program had a boathouse on the Charles River in Dedham, ten minutes from campus.  The school had won consecutive New England Championships in basketball and soccer.

Private high schools in Massachusetts
Private elementary schools in Massachusetts
Private middle schools in Massachusetts
Schools in Norfolk County, Massachusetts
1992 establishments in Massachusetts